The Western International School of Kenya (WISK) is an international school from year 1 to 12 located on the outskirts of Kisumu, Kenya.

Organization
The Western International School of Kenya is a private International school established in 2012. The school enforces no application deadlines and admits students at any time of the academic year.

Curriculum 
The curriculum is built on an inquiry-based philosophy. The inquiry based approach differs greatly from that of a Kenyan public school and is used by most International Schools throughout Africa and the rest of the world. Another example of inquiry based curriculum is the International Baccalaureate or the IB.

The school offers both the English and Kenya National Curriculum.

Academic year
Western International School of Kenya’s academic year has three Semesters:
 Semester 1 runs from August to November.
 Semester 2 runs from December to March.
 Semester 3 runs from April to June.

Enrolments
Western International School of Kenya offers rolling enrollment throughout the year as long as space is available.

References

Kisumu
International schools in Kenya
Educational institutions established in 2012
2012 establishments in Kenya